North Carolina's 9th Senate district is one of 50 districts in the North Carolina Senate. It has been represented by Republican Brent Jackson since 2023.

Geography
Since 2023, the district has included all of Jones, Duplin, Pender, and Bladen counties, as well as most of Sampson County. The district overlaps with the 4th, 12th, 16th, and 22nd state house districts.

District officeholders since 1991

Election results

2022

2020

2018

2016

2014

2012

2010

2008

2006

2004

2002

2000

References

North Carolina Senate districts
Jones County, North Carolina
Duplin County, North Carolina
Pender County, North Carolina
Bladen County, North Carolina
Sampson County, North Carolina